Khatoli is a panchayat village in Sult Tehsil, Almora District, Uttarakhand State, India. Before Sult Tehsil was created as a result of the 2001 census, Khatoli was in Bhikiya Sain Tehsil.  Khatoli is the only village in the Khatoli Gram Panchyat.

Notes

Villages in Almora district